Dosinia exoleta, common name the rayed artemis, is a saltwater clam, a marine bivalve mollusc in the family Veneridae, the venus clams.

Description
These shells can be white, yellowish or pale brown, with darker blotches. They are circular in shape, with a concentric sculpture of fine ribs. They have a very good flavour.

<div align=center>

</div align=center>

<div align=center>

</div align=center>

Distribution and habitat
This species is present in the Boreal-Atlantic zone and Mediterranean Sea.

References
Repetto G., Orlando F. & Arduino G. (2005): Conchiglie del Mediterraneo, Amici del Museo "Federico Eusebio", Alba, Italy

External links
WoRMS
Marine Life Informations
Biolib
Habitas

Dosinia
Molluscs described in 1758
Taxa named by Carl Linnaeus